In Norway Hird was originally retinue of personal armed companions that later developed into the royal court.

Hird may also refer to:

Hird (surname)
Hird (Nazi), a paramilitary organisation in Norway during the Nazi occupation.

See also
Herd (disambiguation)
Hurd (disambiguation)
Heard (disambiguation)